Ethylene glycol (IUPAC name: ethane-1,2-diol) is an organic compound (a vicinal diol) with the formula . It is mainly used for two purposes, as a raw material in the manufacture of polyester fibers and for antifreeze formulations. It is an odorless, colorless, flammable, viscous liquid. Ethylene glycol has a sweet taste, but it is toxic in high concentrations.

Production

Industrial routes
Ethylene glycol is produced from ethylene (ethene), via the intermediate ethylene oxide.  Ethylene oxide reacts with water to produce ethylene glycol according to the chemical equation:

This reaction can be catalyzed by either acids or bases, or can occur at neutral pH under elevated temperatures. The highest yields of ethylene glycol occur at acidic or neutral pH with a large excess of water. Under these conditions, ethylene glycol yields of 90% can be achieved. The major byproducts are the oligomers diethylene glycol, triethylene glycol, and tetraethylene glycol. The separation of these oligomers and water is energy-intensive.  About 6.7 million tonnes are produced annually.

A higher selectivity is achieved by the use of Shell's OMEGA process. In the OMEGA process, the ethylene oxide is first converted with carbon dioxide to ethylene carbonate. This ring is then hydrolyzed with a base catalyst in a second step to produce mono-ethylene glycol in 98% selectivity. The carbon dioxide is released in this step again and can be fed back into the process circuit. The carbon dioxide comes in part from ethylene oxide production, where a part of the ethylene is completely oxidized.

Ethylene glycol is produced from carbon monoxide in countries with large coal reserves and less stringent environmental regulations. The oxidative carbonylation of methanol to dimethyl oxalate provides a promising approach to the production of -based ethylene glycol. Dimethyl oxalate can be converted into ethylene glycol in high yields (94.7%) by hydrogenation with a copper catalyst:

Because the methanol is recycled, only carbon monoxide, hydrogen, and oxygen are consumed. One plant with a production capacity of 200 000 tons of ethylene glycol per year is in Inner Mongolia, and a second plant in the Chinese province of Henan with a capacity of 250 000 tons per year was scheduled for 2012. , four plants in China with a capacity of 200 000 t/a each were operating with at least 17 more to follow.

Biological routes
The caterpillar of the Greater wax moth, Galleria mellonella, has gut bacteria with the ability to degrade polyethylene (PE) into ethylene glycol.

Historical routes 
According to most sources, French chemist Charles-Adolphe Wurtz (1817–1884) first prepared ethylene glycol in 1856.  He first treated "ethylene iodide" with silver acetate and then hydrolyzed the resultant "ethylene diacetate" with potassium hydroxide. Wurtz named his new compound "glycol" because it shared qualities with both ethyl alcohol (with one hydroxyl group) and glycerin (with three hydroxyl groups). In 1859, Wurtz prepared ethylene glycol via the hydration of ethylene oxide. There appears to have been no commercial manufacture or application of ethylene glycol prior to World War I, when it was synthesized from ethylene dichloride in Germany and used as a substitute for glycerol in the explosives industry.

In the United States, semicommercial production of ethylene glycol via ethylene chlorohydrin started in 1917. The first large-scale commercial glycol plant was erected in 1925 at South Charleston, West Virginia, by Carbide and Carbon Chemicals Co. (now Union Carbide Corp.). By 1929, ethylene glycol was being used by almost all dynamite manufacturers. In 1937, Carbide started up the first plant based on Lefort's process for vapor-phase oxidation of ethylene to ethylene oxide. Carbide maintained a monopoly on the direct oxidation process until 1953 when the Scientific Design process was commercialized and offered for licensing.

Uses

Coolant and heat-transfer agent
The major use of ethylene glycol is as an antifreeze agent in the coolant in for example, automobiles and air-conditioning systems that either place the chiller or air handlers outside or must cool below the freezing temperature of water. In geothermal heating/cooling systems, ethylene glycol is the fluid that transports heat through the use of a geothermal heat pump.  The ethylene glycol either gains energy from the source (lake, ocean, water well) or dissipates heat to the sink, depending on whether the system is being used for heating or cooling.

Pure ethylene glycol has a specific heat capacity about one half that of water.  So, while providing freeze protection and an increased boiling point, ethylene glycol lowers the specific heat capacity of water mixtures relative to pure water.  A 1:1 mix by mass has a specific heat capacity of about 3140 J/(kg·°C) (0.75 BTU/(lb·°F)), three quarters that of pure water, thus requiring increased flow rates in same-system comparisons with water.

The mixture of ethylene glycol with water provides additional benefits to coolant and antifreeze solutions, such as preventing corrosion and acid degradation, as well as inhibiting the growth of most microbes and fungi. Mixtures of ethylene glycol and water are sometimes informally referred to in industry as glycol concentrates, compounds, mixtures, or solutions.

Table of thermal and physical properties of saturated liquid ethylene glycol:

Anti-freeze
Pure ethylene glycol freezes at about −12 °C (10.4 °F) but, when mixed with water, the mixture freezes at a lower temperature. For example, a mixture of 60% ethylene glycol and 40% water freezes at −45 °C (−49 °F). Diethylene glycol behaves similarly. The freezing point depression of some mixtures can be explained as a colligative property of solutions but, in highly concentrated mixtures such as the example, deviations from ideal solution behavior are expected due to the influence of intermolecular forces. It's important to note that though pure and distilled water will have a greater specific heat capacity than any mixture of antifreeze and water, commercial antifreezes also typically contain an anti-corrosive additive to prevent pure water from corroding coolant passages in the engine block, cylinder head(s), water pump and radiator.

There is a difference in the mixing ratio, depending on whether it is ethylene glycol or propylene glycol. For ethylene glycol, the mixing ratios are typically 30/70 and 35/65, whereas the propylene glycol mixing ratios are typically 35/65 and 40/60. It is important that the mixture be frost-proof at the lowest operating temperature.

Because of the depressed freezing temperatures, ethylene glycol is used as a de-icing fluid for windshields and aircraft, as an antifreeze in automobile engines, and as a component of vitrification (anticrystallization) mixtures for low-temperature preservation of biological tissues and organs.

The use of ethylene glycol not only depresses the freezing point of aqueous mixtures, but also elevates their boiling point. This results in the operating temperature range for heat-transfer fluids being broadened on both ends of the temperature scale. The increase in boiling temperature is due to pure ethylene glycol having a much higher boiling point and lower vapor pressure than pure water.

Precursor to polymers

In the plastic industry, ethylene glycol is an important precursor to polyester fibers and resins. Polyethylene terephthalate, used to make plastic bottles for soft drinks, is prepared from ethylene glycol.

Other uses

Dehydrating agent
Ethylene glycol is used in the natural gas industry to remove water vapor from natural gas before further processing, in much the same manner as triethylene glycol (TEG).

Hydrate inhibition
Because of its high boiling point and affinity for water, ethylene glycol is a useful desiccant. Ethylene glycol is widely used to inhibit the formation of natural gas clathrates (hydrates) in long multiphase pipelines that convey natural gas from remote gas fields to a gas processing facility. Ethylene glycol can be recovered from the natural gas and reused as an inhibitor after purification treatment that removes water and inorganic salts.

Natural gas is dehydrated by ethylene glycol. In this application, ethylene glycol flows down from the top of a tower and meets a rising mixture of water vapor and hydrocarbon gases. Dry gas exits from the top of the tower. The glycol and water are separated, and the glycol recycled. Instead of removing water, ethylene glycol can also be used to depress the temperature at which hydrates are formed. The purity of glycol used for hydrate suppression (monoethylene glycol) is typically around 80%, whereas the purity of glycol used for dehydration (triethylene glycol) is typically 95 to more than 99%. Moreover, the injection rate for hydrate suppression is much lower than the circulation rate in a glycol dehydration tower.

Applications
Minor uses of ethylene glycol include the manufacture of capacitors, as a chemical intermediate in the manufacture of 1,4-dioxane, as an additive to prevent corrosion in liquid cooling systems for personal computers, and inside the lens devices of cathode-ray tube type of rear projection televisions. Ethylene glycol is also used in the manufacture of some vaccines, but it is not itself present in these injections. It is used as a minor (1–2%) ingredient in shoe polish and also in some inks and dyes. Ethylene glycol has seen some use as a rot and fungal treatment for wood, both as a preventative and a treatment after the fact. It has been used in a few cases to treat partially rotted wooden objects to be displayed in museums. It is one of only a few treatments that are successful in dealing with rot in wooden boats, and is relatively cheap. Ethylene glycol may also be one of the minor ingredients in screen cleaning solutions, along with the main ingredient isopropyl alcohol. Ethylene glycol is commonly used as a preservative for biological specimens, especially in secondary schools during dissection as a safer alternative to formaldehyde. It is also used as part of the water-based hydraulic fluid used to control subsea oil and gas production equipment.

Ethylene glycol is used as a protecting group in organic synthesis to protect carbonyl compounds such as ketones and aldehydes.

Silicon dioxide reacts in heated reflux under dinitrogen with ethylene glycol and an alkali metal base to produce highly reactive, pentacoordinate silicates which provide access to a wide variety of new silicon compounds. The silicates are essentially insoluble in all polar solvents except methanol.

It also can be used in vaccine manufacture or as a formaldehyde substitute when preserving biological specimens.

Chemical reactions
Ethylene glycol is used as a protecting group for carbonyl groups in organic synthesis. Treating a ketone or aldehyde with ethylene glycol in the presence of an acid catalyst (e.g., p-toluenesulfonic acid; BF3·Et2O) gives the corresponding a 1,3-dioxolane, which is resistant to bases and other nucleophiles. The 1,3-dioxolane protecting group can thereafter be removed by further acid hydrolysis. In this example, isophorone was protected using ethylene glycol with p-toluenesulfonic acid in moderate yield. Water was removed by azeotropic distillation to shift the equilibrium to the right.

Toxicity 

Ethylene glycol has relatively high mammalian toxicity when ingested, roughly on par with methanol, with an oral LDLo = 786 mg/kg for humans. The major danger is due to its sweet taste, which can attract children and animals. Upon ingestion, ethylene glycol is oxidized to glycolic acid, which is, in turn, oxidized to oxalic acid, which is toxic. It and its toxic byproducts first affect the central nervous system, then the heart, and finally the kidneys. Ingestion of sufficient amounts is fatal if untreated. Several deaths are recorded annually in the U.S. alone.

Antifreeze products for automotive use containing propylene glycol in place of ethylene glycol are available. They are generally considered safer to use, as propylene glycol is not as palatable and is converted in the body to lactic acid, a normal product of metabolism and exercise.

Australia, the UK, and seventeen US states (as of 2012) require the addition of a bitter flavoring (denatonium benzoate) to antifreeze. In December 2012, US antifreeze manufacturers agreed voluntarily to add a bitter flavoring to all antifreeze that is sold in the consumer market of the US.

In 2022, several hundred children died of acute kidney failure in Indonesia and The Gambia because the paracetamol syrup made by New Delhi-based Maiden Pharmaceuticals contained ethylene glycol and diethylene glycol, ingredients that have been linked to child deaths from acute kidney injury in The Gambia. In December 2022, Uzbekistan's health ministry has said children died as a result of ethylene glycol in cough syrup made by Marion Biotech, which is based at Noida, near New Delhi.

Environmental effects

Ethylene glycol is a high-production-volume chemical; it breaks down in air in about 10 days and in water or soil in a few weeks. It enters the environment through the dispersal of ethylene glycol-containing products, especially at airports, where it is used in de-icing agents for runways and airplanes. While prolonged low doses of ethylene glycol show no toxicity, at near lethal doses (≥ 1000 mg/kg per day) ethylene glycol acts as a teratogen. "Based on a rather extensive database, it induces skeletal variations and malformations in rats and mice by all routes of exposure."  This molecule has been observed in outer space.

Notes

References

External links 

 WebBook page for C2H6O2
 ATSDR - Case Studies in Environmental Medicine: Ethylene Glycol and Propylene Glycol Toxicity
 CDC - NIOSH Pocket Guide to Chemical Hazards
 Antifreeze ratio for Ethylene Glycol and Propylene Glycol
 Medical information
 

Alcohol solvents
Alkanediols
Commodity chemicals
Hazardous air pollutants
Household chemicals
Sugar alcohols
Vicinal diols